Wonderloch Kellerland was an international project and exhibition space founded by René Luckhardt in his Berlin apartment in the beginning of 2010. The name relates to Dostoyevsky’s Notes from Underground (German: “Aufzeichnungen aus dem Kellerloch”) and Lewis Carroll’s Alice's Adventures in Wonderland. A role model was also Ludwig II of Bavaria, the “greatest Kellerloch-artist of all times”. The German magazine Art Das Kunstmagazin refers to Wonderloch Kellerland as the “boot camp of subculture”.

Exhibitions
Exhibitions included upcoming L.A. and Berlin based artists. But also works by  Martin Kippenberger, Friedrich Schroder-Sonnenstern, Helga Goetze, Louis Waldon, Laibach or a selection of Viennese artists curated by Stefan Bidner and Elke Krystufek. Apart from that Wonderloch Kellerland regularly hosted previously unseen curiosities, e.g. handpainted ceramics of the French Foreign Legion from the Adam Saks Collection, or a "space clearing" by Bettina Sellmann.

With ARTISTS MERCHANDISING ART Wonderloch Kellerland initiated the first series of international exhibitions to deal with the issue of merchandising in contemporary art. The show featured about 300 artists and was exhibited in Berlin, Paris, Los Angeles, Hamburg and Vienna.
In 2011 a branch of Wonderloch Kellerland opened in Los Angeles, run by Hans-Peter Thomas. Both spaces are included in the Art Spaces Directory of the New Museum New York. Wonderloch Kellerland closed in 2014.

Project Philosophy
The philosophy of the project was given as: “As an artist you have to go through rabbit holes or cellar holes (German: Kellerlocher) – like Lewis Carroll’s Alice – in order to get to the Wonderland, to blossom anew and to set free new energies.”

References
 Wonderloch Kellerland at Art Spaces Directory New Museum New York
 ART on Wonderloch Kellerland Berlin / Los Angeles
 Wonderloch Kellerland at Monopol Art Magazine
 Interrogation Machine Book Presentation and Laibach Screening
 Corporealities Wiener Innen Aussen
 Deutschlandradio on exhibition Helga Goetze
 ART on exhibition Portraits of Roy Lichtenstein and Leo Castelli by Katrin Thomas

Further reading
 Art Spaces Directory of New Museum NY 

Catalogue Dominik Wood Immortal Worship

Catalogue Adam Saks Un métier d'homme

Notes

External links
 Wonderloch Kellerland homepage

Artist-run centres
Art exhibitions in Germany
Art exhibitions in the United States
Avant-garde art